Trevor Boris (born September 10, 1980) is a Canadian comedian, writer and television producer.

Television work
Boris is one of the stars of MuchMusic's Video on Trial, and is also a star of Stars Gone Wild. He has also appeared on many other MuchMusic specials including Stars on Trial, LOL!, Spring Break '07, Totally 80s Video on Trial, Video on Trial: Holiday Crap, Overrated in 06, and wrote the special Famous Fallouts. He was also a producer of Video on Trial at one point. He was also a presenter at the 2006 MuchMusic Video Awards. He was also a spokesperson for Sunsilk which aired numerous Hair on Trial commercials on MuchMusic. He also made an appearance on The Latest Buzz on Family Channel.

In 2007 Boris had his very own Comedy Now! standup special air on CTV and The Comedy Network, was the runner-up in the 2006 Great Canadian Laugh Off (the winner received $25,000) that aired on The Comedy Network, and was the host of the same-sex wedding show I Now Pronounce You... on OUTtv. He has been nominated twice for the "Best Stand-up Newcomer" Canadian Comedy Award, and has performed at the Just for Laughs Comedy Festival, as well as the CBC Winnipeg, Halifax, and Vancouver Comedy Festivals and at the 2006 Cape Town Comedy Festival in South Africa.

He has been featured numerous times on entertainment shows such as eTalk Daily, Star! Daily, Inside Jam!, CBC Television's The National and CBC Radio One's The Debaters, and was recently featured on the cover of NOW in Toronto, Ontario. He has also written for The National Post.

He was also part of season five of Last Comic Standing when they auditioned in Montreal, Quebec. He made it to the Finals of Canada (Top 15) but did not advance to L.A.

In 2012, Trevor made his late night U.S. TV debut when he performed stand up on Conan.

He has also worked as a television producer, most recently as a Supervising Producer on Big Brother Canada. Since the first season, he has been the voice of Marsha the Moose, a magical Moose who lives in the house and occasionally gives secret tasks to the house guest's. Marsha became a hit and has been seen once a season.  Since season two of the show, he has served a challenge producer coming up with different challenges.  He also worked on Season 18 of Big Brother USA in LA in 2016. He also produced Canada's Got Talent, which was retired after only one season.

Personal life
He is openly gay.

Filmography

Television

Awards and nominations

References

External links
 
 

1980 births
Canadian stand-up comedians
Canadian television personalities
Canadian television producers
Living people
Canadian male comedians
Gay comedians
Canadian gay writers
People from Selkirk, Manitoba
Writers from Manitoba
Canadian sketch comedians
21st-century Canadian comedians
Comedians from Manitoba
Canadian LGBT comedians
21st-century Canadian LGBT people